Joshua Rufus Rozenberg KC (hon) (born 30 May 1950) is a British solicitor, legal commentator, and journalist.

Early life and career
He was educated at Latymer Upper School in Hammersmith and Wadham College, University of Oxford, where he took a law degree. He qualified as a solicitor in 1976 after training at Dixon Ward solicitors in Richmond, London.

Rozenberg began his career in journalism in 1975 at the BBC, where he launched Law in Action on BBC Radio 4 in 1984. At the BBC he worked as a producer, reporter and then legal correspondent. In 2000 he left to join The Daily Telegraph as legal affairs editor, where he remained until the end of 2008. In 2015 he explained that he had resigned because news editors had altered one of his reports without his knowledge to make what he had already warned them was a false claim. After leaving the Telegraph he wrote a column for the Evening Standard.

Now a freelance journalist, he writes regular columns for the Law Society Gazette and The Critic. He wrote a weekly column for The Guardian's online law page from 2010 to 2016. Also in 2010, he returned to the BBC to present Law in Action, nearly 25 years after leaving the radio programme.

Rozenberg holds honorary doctorates in law from the University of Hertfordshire (1999), Nottingham Trent University (2012), the University of Lincoln (2014) and the University of Law (2014). Rozenberg is also an honorary bencher of Gray's Inn, and is a non-executive board member of the Law Commission. He has won the Bar Council's Legal Reporting Award four times. In January 2016, he was made an honorary QC.

Personal life
Rozenberg is married to fellow journalist Melanie Phillips; the couple have two children. He is Jewish.

Publications

Joshua Rozenberg (24 April 1997). Trial of Strength, Richard Cohen Books, .

References

External links

Joshua Rozenberg's Twitter account
Columns for The Critic
Rozenberg's blog at The Guardian
Law column at Standpoint
Law Reports, the former column of Rozenberg at the Daily Telegraph

People educated at Latymer Upper School
Alumni of Wadham College, Oxford
BBC newsreaders and journalists
British Jews
British male journalists
British solicitors
Living people
1950 births
Honorary King's Counsel